The British Rail Class 93 is a tri-mode locomotive being built by Stadler Rail in Valencia. They will be an evolution of the Class 88 bi-mode locomotives which were built by Stadler for Direct Rail Services. Three different power sources will be used to power the locomotive –  25kVAC overhead electric power, or a  diesel engine supplemented by a  battery – allowing the locomotive to be used on both electrified and non-electrified lines.

Rail Operations Group have ordered 30 locomotives, with the first deliveries scheduled for 2023.

Development

Background
Historically, the vast majority of freight trains on Britain's railways have used diesel propulsion since the 1960s. During the late 2010s, as part of wider efforts to pursue carbon neutral operations, the Department for Transport (DfT) stated its long term goal of eliminating diesel-only traction from Britain's railways by 2040, despite only 46.5 per cent of all lines being electrified. However, due to a lack of government support for the rail freight sector, operators have traditionally faced difficulty in justifying sizable capital investments such as new locomotives, thus large numbers are between 25 and 50 years old as of 2020.

Rationale
Founded in 2015, Rail Operations Group (ROG) quickly took an interest in bi-mode propulsion technology as well as high-speed freight operations. The company observed that rival operators made heavy use of the Class 66, a locomotive introduced in the mid-1990s, and that this would be the base line to innovate against in the locomotive-hauled freight market. ROG opted to work in conjunction with locomotive manufacturer Stadler Rail to develop a tri-mode high powered locomotive concept, which has since been assigned the designation of Class 93. The concept was first proposed during 2018.

Development history
In January 2021, ROG confirmed their order of 30 Class 93 locomotives, with the first 10 deliveries scheduled for 2023. Grand Union has proposed using Class 93s on its London Euston to Stirling services.

By July 2022, production had started at Stadler's plant in Valencia.

Specification
The Class 93 locomotive is a derivative of the Class 88 electro-diesel and Class 68 diesel locomotives, both of which were built by Stadler. As with Class 88 locomotives, Class 93s are designed as fast freight locomotives that uses electric power while under the wires, but that are also capable of self-powered operations. The diesel engine is a turbocharged twelve-cylinder Caterpillar C32, which conforms with the EU's Stage V emissions standards.

The batteries packs use lithium-titanium oxide chemistry and will have a liquid cooling solution, enabling rapid charge and discharge. The battery packs can be charged either from the overhead AC supply via the onboard transformer, by the diesel engine when the full output is not needed for traction, or by using power reclaimed during regenerative braking. As the battery packs are carried in the space used on Class 88 locomotives for the rheostatic brake resistor grids, Class 93s will not be equipped with rheostatic braking and will be limited to using the friction brakes alone if the batteries are full or otherwise cannot accept charge. 

The batteries have a capacity of 80kWh, sufficient for ten minutes of boost. They can also be used to supply standalone traction power.

Proposed use
In addition to freight, the Class 93 has also been designed to accommodate the haulage of passenger stock, including a variable-height Dellner coupling and a three-step Westcode brake in addition to its conventional two-pipe air brake.

Comparison with competing locomotives
In comparison with the Class 66, the Class 93 can outperform it in various metrics. In addition to a higher top speed, the locomotive possesses greater acceleration and far lower operating costs, consuming only a third of the fuel of a Class 66 along with lower track access charges due to its lower weight. ROG has postulated that it presents a superior business case, particularly for intermodal rail freight operations, while also being better suited for mixed-traffic operations as well. Each locomotive has a reported rough cost of £4million.

Models
In 2021, Revolution Trains announced they were in the early stages of developing a OO gauge model of the Class 93, using CAD data supplied by Stadler.

See also
 Dual-mode locomotive

References

Bo-Bo locomotives
Electro-diesel locomotives of Great Britain
Macosa/Meinfesa/Vossloh Espana locomotives
Proposed British rail vehicles

Standard gauge locomotives of Great Britain